Thayatheru is a small place in Kannur district of Kerala state, South India. Thayatheru means "the street below". It is near Kannur and is easily accessible via National Highway 17 (NH 17). 

Thayatheru is mainly a residential area with a large Muslim population. The major Malayalam newspaper, Malayala Manorama, has its Kannur district office in Thayatheru. The Malabar Chamber of Commerce, Kannur is also near Thayatheru.

See also 
Kannur City
Kannur

References

Suburbs of Kannur